Greatest Hits is Craig David's first greatest hits album and was released on 24 November 2008. It contains three new songs, "Where's Your Love", "Insomnia" and "Just My Imagination" (unrelated to the track on his 2010 album). "Officially Yours" and "Unbelievable" are the only two singles previously released by David not to feature on the album.

The album peaked at number 48 in the UK, thus becoming David's lowest-charting album to date. It received a Silver certification from the BPI. In 2016, after the release of Following My Intuition, it rose to a new peak of number 28 after entering the top 40 for the first time.

Reception

BBC Music said of the album:

Track listing
 "Rendezvous", "Spanish", "World Filled with Love" and "This Is the Girl" are omitted from the single-disc version of the album.

 Disc two (DVD)
 "Fill Me In"
 "7 Days"
 "Walking Away"
 "What's Your Flava?"
 "Rise & Fall" 
 "All the Way"
 "Don't Love You No More (I'm Sorry)"
 "This Is the Girl" 
 "Hot Stuff (Let's Dance)"
 "Where's Your Love"

Personnel
Credits adapted from album's liner notes.

Omar Adimora – mixing (track 7)
Jim Beanz – producer, engineer, and mixing (track 4)
Craig David – vocals (all tracks), producer (tracks 7, 13, 17)
Steve Fitzmaurice – mixing (track 1, 6, 13)
Matt Furmidge – mixing (track 12)
Trevor "Trell" Henry – producer, mixing, and rap (track 5)
Mark Hill – producer (tracks 1, 2, 6, 8, 9, 11, 14, 16, 18), mixing (tracks 2, 9, 18), additional vocals (track 9)
Kano – producer and vocals (track 17)
Kenneth Karlin – producer (track 3)
Koil – engineer and mixing (track 4)
Tim Liken – mixing (track 7)
Manny Marroquin – mixing (track 3)
Anthony Marshall – producer and mixing (tracks 5, 11)
Paul Meehan – producer (track 12)
Brian Rawling – producer (track 12)
Rita Ora – vocals (track 7)
Fraser T Smith – producer (tracks 7, 13, 15, 17, 19), mixing (track 15, 19)
Soulshock – producer and mixing (track 3)
Mark "Spike" Stent – mixing (tracks 8, 11, 14, 16, 17)
Sting – vocals (track 3)
Tinchy Stryder – vocals (track 7)
Martin Terefe – producer (track 15)

Charts

Weekly charts

Year-end charts

Certifications

Release history

References

Craig David albums
2008 greatest hits albums
2008 video albums
Music video compilation albums